Jim Morris (1895-1988) was an Australian rugby league footballer who played in the 1920s.

Playing career
Morris was a pioneer player at St George, who started in their very first season in Reserve Grade in 1921. He played First Grade the following year and continued playing grade with them until 1928 and spent many years in behind the scenes roles at the club after he retired.  Morris was almost the last foundation year player still alive in 1988 besides Reg Fusedale and Ernie Lapham.

Death
Morris died on 9 April 1988, age 93.

References

St. George Dragons players
Australian rugby league players
Rugby league players from Sydney
Rugby league second-rows
Rugby league props
1895 births
1988 deaths